Alejandro "Álex" Alfaro Cascales (born 15 June 2002) is a Spanish professional footballer who plays as a midfielder for Elche CF Ilicitano.

Club career
After playing for four years in the youth categories of Valencia CF, Alfaro joined Elche CF in 2018. He made his senior debut with the latter's reserves on 4 September 2021, starting in a 1–1 Tercera División RFEF home draw against Hércules CF B.

Alfaro scored his first senior goal on 5 January 2022, netting the B's second in a 2–2 away draw against the same opponent. In July, he was included in the first team's pre-season, before making his professional – and La Liga – debut on 15 August, after coming on as a second-half substitute for Gerard Gumbau in a 3–0 away loss against Real Betis.

References

External links

2002 births
Living people
Footballers from Alicante
Spanish footballers
Association football midfielders
La Liga players
Tercera Federación players
Elche CF Ilicitano footballers
Elche CF players